Schoenotenes elasma is a species of moth of the family Tortricidae first described by Józef Razowski in 2013. It is found on Seram Island in Indonesia.

The wingspan is about 34 mm. The ground colour of the forewings is whitish, sprinkled and suffused with grey and with rust-brown markings. The hindwings are pale brownish grey.

Etymology
The specific name refers to the shape of sterigma and is derived from Greek elasma (meaning a plate).

References

Moths described in 2013
Schoenotenini